Putoidae is a family of scale insects commonly known as giant mealybugs or putoids. There is probably a single genus, Puto, containing about sixty species. The genus name Macrocerococcus has also been used but it is now considered to be a synonym of Puto.  The genus Puto was formerly classified as a member of the Pseudococcidae; however, it so significantly differed from the rest of the Pseudococcidae that it was accorded its own family Putoidae.

Hosts
Giant mealybugs occur on a wide range of hosts, each species having its own specific host. Host plants commonly include conifers, grasses and various woody shrubs. All parts of the plant can be infested.

Description
The adult female is oval and up to five millimetres long and concealed by tufts of powdery white wax. If the wax is removed, two longitudinal black stripes can be seen on the upper surface of the body and the wax glands are large and conspicuous. The legs and antennae are well developed and a dark colour.

Life cycle
There are generally four instars in the female and five in the male. In many species there is a single generation each year and the first instar is the over-wintering stage. Puto sandini however takes four years to complete its life cycle.

Species
 Puto antennatus Sign., 1875 ("conifer mealybug")

References
  

Scale insects
Hemiptera families
Archaeococcoids